Side judge, or assistant judge, is a judicial position unique to the U.S. state of Vermont.  There are two side judges in each of Vermont's 14 counties. Like lay judges, side judges are usually not legal professionals.

Duties and responsibilities

While Family, District and Superior Court judges are appointed by the Governor, probate and side judges are elected.  Side judges run at-large (not specifically for one of the two seats) and county-wide in November of even-numbered, non-presidential election years, and serve four-year terms.  The terms begin on the following February 1.

In the event of a vacancy, the Governor is empowered to appoint a replacement.

Side judges sit with the judge in Superior (civil cases and violations of traffic laws and municipal ordinances) and Family Court.  There are Superior and Family Courts located in each of Vermont's 14 counties at their "shire town" or county seat.

There are normally two side judges on the bench, but the court may proceed with only one side judge or none.  In theory the side judges, who are generally not attorneys, have input only on matters of fact, with matters of law left to the presiding judge, but the vote of a side judge has the same weight as that of the judge, so two side judges can outvote the judge. If there is only one side judge and the side judge and the judge disagree on a matter of fact, a mistrial is declared.  Side judges who undergo some training may also sit alone in small claims, uncontested divorces, traffic offenses, and violations of municipal ordinances.

Side judges have administrative duties in addition to court responsibilities. They appoint the County Clerk, Treasurer and Auditor, Road Commissioners, and Notaries Public, manage the county courthouse, sheriff's office and other property, and prepare the county budget.  As a result, side judges receive two types of compensation: a salary for their administrative duties, paid by the county, and a per diem for their judicial duties, paid by the state.

Once the county budget has been determined, municipalities in the county are assessed a portion, based on their grand list (total evaluation of property in the municipality).

Vermont's Assistant Judges also have a professional association and lobbying group, the Vermont Association of County Judges.

History
The position of side judge was part of Vermont's government during the mid to late 1700s period of the Vermont Republic, and was continued in the Vermont Constitution when Vermont was admitted to the Union as the fourteenth state in 1791.

The idea of side judges appear to have been borrowed from the colony of Pennsylvania, and they were also part of the judiciary in other states, including New Hampshire and Connecticut.  In Vermont, they were created in part because early Vermont residents were distrustful of lawyers, many of whom had received their training in England before the American Revolution, making their loyalty suspect, or had supported New York during the dispute between New York's colonial government and Vermont's original white settlers over control of Vermont's first towns.  The founders of Vermont had purchased their land grants from Benning Wentworth, the Governor of New Hampshire.  When the British government supported New York's attempts to assert control, those with New Hampshire land grants refused to re-purchase them from New York.  Adding lay judges to the courts was a means of ensuring that pro-British or pro-New York judges could not control the courts.

Though reorganization of the judiciary in other states eliminated the side judge position, It has continued in Vermont.  Some updates and changes to Vermont's court system included elimination or a reduced role for the side judges, but most of those efforts have been unsuccessful.

Notable side judges

 David M. Camp, Lieutenant Governor from 1836 to 1841, Orleans County Assistant Judge, 1830 to 1832 and 1834 to 1835.
 William Chamberlain, United States Representative, 1803 to 1805, 1809 to 1811, Orange County Assistant Judge, 1795–1796.
 Augustine Clarke, Vermont State Treasurer from 1833 to 1837, Caledonia County Assistant Judge, 1824–1825.
 Charles S. Dana, Speaker of the Vermont House of Representatives from 1917 to 1921, Addison County Assistant Judge, 1908–1912. 
 Edward H. Edgerton, President pro tempore of the Vermont State Senate from 1925 to 1927, Windsor County Assistant Judge, 1913–1921.
 Abram W. Foote, Lieutenant Governor from 1921 to 1923, Assistant Judge of Addison County from 1902 to 1906.
 Jonas Galusha, Governor of Vermont from 1809 to 1813 and 1815 to 1820, Assistant Judge of Bennington County from 1795 to 1798.
 William Hunter, United States Representative, 1817 to 1819, Assistant Judge of Windsor County, 1805–1816.
 Elias Keyes, United States Representative from 1821 to 1823, Assistant Judge of Windsor County, 1803 to 1814.
 William C. Kittredge, Lieutenant Governor from 1852 to 1853, Rutland County Assistant Judge, 1831–1838.
 Aaron Leland, Lieutenant Governor from 1822 to 1827, Windsor County Assistant Judge, 1803–1817, 1818–1822.
 Orlando L. Martin, Speaker of the Vermont House of Representatives from 1923 to 1925, Washington County Assistant Judge, 1939 to his death.
 Samuel Mattocks, Vermont State Treasurer from 1786 to 1800, Rutland County Assistant Judge, 1783–1788, 1794.
Gideon Olin, United States Representative, 1803–1807, Assistant Judge of Bennington County, 1781–1798.
 William M. Pingry, Vermont Auditor of Accounts from 1853 to 1860, Assistant Judge in both Washington (1838–1839) and Windsor (1880 to his death) Counties.
 Thomas Porter, Speaker of the Vermont House of Representatives, 1780 to 1782, Assistant Judge of Rutland County, 1781–1782.
 James M. Slade, son of Governor William Slade, Lieutenant Governor from 1856 to 1857, Assistant Judge of Addison County, 1868 to 1870.
 John Spaulding, Vermont State Treasurer from 1841 to 1846.
 Paul Spooner, Lieutenant Governor, 1782 to 1787, Windsor County Assistant Judge, 1779–1782, 1785–1789.
 Zed S. Stanton, Lieutenant Governor of Vermont from 1902 to 1904, Washington County Assistant Judge, 1884–1888.
 John Strong, Speaker of the Vermont House of Representatives in 1786, Assistant Judge of Bennington County, 1781–1782.
 John E. Weeks, Governor from 1927 to 1931, Addison County Assistant Judge, 1884–1886.
 David Wing Jr., Secretary of State of Vermont from 1802 to 1806, Caledonia County Assistant Judge, 1797-1803, Presiding Judge, 1804-1806.
 Augustus Young, United States Representative, 1841 to 1843, Franklin County Assistant Judge, 1851–1854.

Current side judges
As of June 2022, the assistant judges in each county are:

See also
 Judicial System of Sweden: Lay Judges
 Assessor (law)

References

External links
 Rutland Herald article
 Vermont's Court System

Region-specific legal occupations
Vermont state court judges